The black marsh skimmer, or light-tipped demon, (Indothemis carnatica) is a species of dragonfly in the family Libellulidae. It is found in India, Sri Lanka and Thailand.

Description and habitat
It is a small dark violaceous or blackish-brown dragonfly with yellow markings obscurely showing through. Its thorax is blackish-brown, obscured with pruinescence and appears uniformly dark violaceous in full adults. Young males and females are yellowish. Abdomen is dark violaceous with yellow markings obscurely showing through. Its anal appendages are pale yellow tipped with black. 

Female differs very widely from the male in colour and markings. Its thorax is golden-yellow on dorsum, pale greenish-yellow
laterally. There is a diffuse brown antehumeral stripe. Abdomen is golden-yellow on dorsum, fading to greenish-yellow laterally, marked with black and reddish-brown. There is a narrow sub-dorsal stripe extending in a very broken manner from segment 2 to the end of abdomen. There is a mid-dorsal stripe black on carina, brown at its borders extending from segment 2 to 9, broadening on the terminal segments and becoming confluent with the sub-dorsal stripe. Segment 10 is yellow, with
base and apical border narrowly black. Anal appendages are pale yellow tipped with black.

It breeds in weeded ponds and lakes.

See also
 List of odonates of Sri Lanka
 List of odonates of India
 List of odonata of Kerala

References

 carnatica.html World Dragonflies
 Animal diversity web
 Query Results 

Libellulidae
Odonata of Asia
Insects of Southeast Asia
Insects of India